Gyöngyös is a town in Heves county in Hungary,  east of Budapest. Situated at the foot of the Sár-hegy and Mátra mountains, it is the home of numerous food production plants, including milk production and sausage factories. It is also the home of many vineyards on the slopes of the Sárhegy.

The Art-Nouveau and Baroque buildings around the main square were reconstructed after a disastrous fire started in the local hospital in 1917, destroying a number of buildings housing important Jewish institutions and leaving in all around 8,000 homeless.

Name 

The meaning of the town's name is "Made of Pearls"; Croats from Hungary call this city Đunđuš . The 16/17th-century historian Miklós Istvánffy wrote that the name of the town comes from the Hungarian word for mistletoe (fagyöngy literally "wood-pearl"), which is abundant in the local woods.

History
Gyöngyös was home to a large Jewish community before World War II. In 1942, anti-Jewish laws were adopted in the province, affecting the Jews of the town. Following the occupation of Hungary by the German army in March 1944, 1800 Jews were locked in a ghetto. Some were saved by Hungarian Righteous Among the Nations personnel but most of them were deported to Auschwitz where they were murdered.

Sights to visit 
There are many monuments and places of interest in the town, such as the Orczy mansion, home of the Mátra Museum, Saint Bartholomew's Church (Saint Bartholomew Church, Gyöngyös, Hungary) in the center of town, and its Treasury.

Notable residents 
 Gyöngyi Horváth, sociologist, conference organiser 
 Rudolph Ritter von Brudermann (1851–1941), general of Austria-Hungary during the First World War
 Béla Kerékjártó (1898–1946), mathematician
 Sandor Kenyeres (born 1949), property developer, scientific philanthropist, and cultural visionary
 Gedeon Richter (1872–1944), pharmacist, business magnate, philanthropist, founder of Gedeon Richter plc, pioneer of the Hungarian pharmaceutical industry
 Soma Visontai (1854–?), lawyer, deputy
 Paul Vay de Vaya (1735–1800), Major General (1794), Feldmarschall-leutnant (1799–1800)
 Margit Gréczi (born 1941), painter
 Zita Pataki (born 1973), weather presenter

Politics 
 Gábor Vona (born 1978), politician, leader of the political party Jobbik 
 Gábor Fodor (born 1962), jurist, politician, leader of the Hungarian Liberal Party
 Pál Almásy (1818–1882), lawyer, politician, Speaker of the House of Representatives (1849)
 Károly Kamermayer (1829–1897), jurist, councillor, the first mayor of Budapest (1873–1896)
 József Balázs (born 1965), politician
 Gabor Horváth, (born 1963) brigadier general, army carrier officer, promoter of NATO and EU membership, commander

Sports 
 Viktor Szabó (born 1986), footballer
 Dárius Csillag (born 1995), footballer
 Dávid Ficsór (born 1986), footballer
 Gergő Gohér (born 1987), footballer
 András Herczeg (born 1956), football manager, former player, manager of Debreceni VSC
 Zsófia Kovács (born 1988), professional triathlete
 József Éles (born 1969), former handball player, handball coach of the Dominican Republic women's national team
 Attila Szekrényessy (1913–1995), pair skater
 Gabriella Csépe (born 1973), swimmer
 László Polgár (born 1946), educational psychologist and developer of educational method to develop "stars" (whom he calls "geniuses"). He and his wife Klára used his method to develop daughters Zsuzsa Susan Polgár, Zsófi Sofia Polgár  and Judit Polgár into the world's leading chess players, Olympic champions. His paternal grandfather in yöngyös was a great Talmudic scholar.
 Energia SC Gyöngyös (1992–present), football club

Twin towns – sister cities

Gyöngyös is twinned with:

 Luohe, China
 Manisa, Turkey
 Pieksämäki, Finland
 Ringsted, Denmark
 Sanok, Poland
 Štip, North Macedonia
 Târgu Secuiesc, Romania
 Zeltweg, Austria
 Shusha, Azerbaijan

Gallery

References

External links

  .
 

Populated places in Heves County
Orczy family